The Rural Municipality of Porcupine No. 395 is a rural municipality (RM) in the Canadian province of Saskatchewan within Census Division No. 14 and  Division No. 4. It is located in the northeast-central portion of the province.

History 
The RM of Porcupine No. 395 incorporated as a rural municipality on February 28, 1944.

Geography

Communities and localities 
The following urban municipalities are surrounded by the RM.

Towns
Porcupine Plain

Villages
Weekes

The following unincorporated communities are within the RM.

Organized hamlets
Prairie River

Localities
Carragana, dissolved as a village, March 25, 1998
Dillabough
Somme

Demographics 

Government 
The RM of Porcupine No. 395 is governed by an elected municipal council and an appointed administrator that meets on the first Thursday of every month. The reeve of the RM is Steve Kwiatkowski while its administrator is Nicole Smith. The RM's office is located in Porcupine Plain.

Transportation 
Highway 23 - serves Carragana and Prairie River
Highway 677 - serves Carragana
Highway 38

See also 
List of rural municipalities in Saskatchewan

References 

P